A. Frederick Meyerson (February 2, 1918 – June 29, 2009) was an American lawyer and politician from New York.

Life
He was born on February 2, 1918. He attended Thomas Jefferson High School. He graduated from St. John's College of Liberal Arts and Sciences, and from St. John's University School of Law. He was admitted to the bar in 1944, and was employed by the Bureau of Internal Revenue. Later he was law clerk to a Supreme Court Justice. He married Shirley, and they had two children.

Meyerson was a member of the New York State Senate from 1969 to 1976, sitting in the 178th, 179th, 180th and 181st New York State Legislatures. In the evening of July 17, 1969, he tried to assist two policemen and got stabbed in the back twice by members of a youth gang. He resigned his seat in March 1976, and was appointed to the New York City Criminal Court.

In November 1982, he was elected to the New York Supreme Court (2nd D.).

He died on June 29, 2009.

References

1918 births
2009 deaths
Politicians from Brooklyn
Democratic Party New York (state) state senators
New York Supreme Court Justices
St. John's University School of Law alumni
20th-century American judges
Thomas Jefferson High School (Brooklyn) alumni
St. John's University (New York City) alumni
20th-century American politicians